The 2005 election of the Speaker of the New Zealand House of Representatives occurred on 3 March 2005, following the retirement of the previous Speaker Jonathan Hunt. The election resulted in the election of Labour Party MP Margaret Wilson.

Nominated candidates
 Hon Ken Shirley, List MP – ACT Party
 Hon Clem Simich, MP for  – National Party
 Hon Margaret Wilson, List MP – Labour Party

Election
The election was conducted by means of a conventional parliamentary motion. The Clerk of the House of Representatives conducted a vote on the question of the election of the Speaker, in accordance with Standing Order 19.

The following table gives the election results:

How each MP voted:

References

Speaker of the House of Representatives election
Speaker of the House of Representatives election
Speaker of the House of Representatives of New Zealand elections